Mathilde Johansson (born 28 April 1985) is a Swedish-born retired French tennis player.

Professional career

She made her WTA Tour main-draw debut at the 2005 French Open, losing to sixth-seed Svetlana Kuznetsova in the first round. In 2006, she reached the second round, losing to Russian youngster Maria Kirilenko in straight sets.

In 2009, she reached two WTA quarterfinals, in Acapulco and in Bogotá (where she was seeded No. 6).

In 2011, Johansson reached her first WTA tournament final in Bogotá, losing to Lourdes Domínguez Lino in three sets.

In April 2012, as a lucky loser, she reached the semifinals of the Grand Prix in Fès (Morocco), eventually falling to Laura Pous Tio. Later in May, at the French Open, she reached for the first time the third round of a major tournament, falling to Sloane Stephens. In July, Johansson reached the finals of the Swedish Open losing to Polona Hercog, in three sets.

For one of her last tournaments in the season, she reached the quarterfinals in Guangzhou, where she was beaten by Hsieh Su-wei in straight sets. Overall in 2012, she fell in the first round ten times.

In 2016, Johansson decided to retire after the French Open singles qualifying tournament where she was beaten in the second round by Ivana Jorović.

WTA career finals

Singles: 2 (2 runner-ups)

ITF Circuit finals

Singles: 20 (14–6)

Doubles: 3 (1–2)

Grand Slam performance timelines

Singles

Doubles

References

External links
 
 

1985 births
Living people
French female tennis players
French people of Swedish descent
Sportspeople from Boulogne-Billancourt
Sportspeople from Gothenburg
Swedish emigrants to France